Lobito Airport  is an airport serving in Lobito, a town and municipality in the Benguela Province of Angola.

Accidents and incidents
On 15 December 1994, Basler BT-67 N96BF of SL Aviation Services was damaged beyond repair in a take-off accident when flight was attempted with insufficient airspeed. Both crew were killed.
On 21 August 1995, a Douglas DC-3 that had been converted to turboprop engines was written off at Lobito Airport.

See also

 List of airports in Angola
 Transport in Angola

References

External links
OpenStreetMap - Lobito
OurAirports - Lobito
 Photograph of building and tower at Lobito Airport

Airports in Angola
Buildings and structures in Benguela Province